Gemorodes delphinopa is a moth in the family Xyloryctidae. It was described by Edward Meyrick in 1930. It is found in Myanmar.

References

Xyloryctidae
Moths described in 1930